Chill is an investigative and modern horror role-playing game originally published by Pacesetter Ltd in 1984 that captures the feel of 20th-century horror films.

Setting
Chill is inspired by, and attempts to capture the feel of, 20th-century horror films, where usual foes are vampires, werewolves, mummies, ghosts, and ghouls. Players take on the role of envoys, members of a secret organization known as S.A.V.E. (Societas Argenti Viae Eternitata, or, The Eternal Society of the Silver Way) that tracks down and eliminates evil in the world.

History
The game was introduced by Pacesetter Ltd in 1984. The following year, Target Games released a Swedish version under the name Chock (Swedish for "shock" or "fright"), and in 1985, Schmidt Spiele released a French version. Pacesetter also launched the board game Black Morn Manor, also translated into French (Le Manoir des Ténèbres) by Schmidt Spiele.

Pacesetter ceased operations in 1986, bringing the publication of the first edition of Chill to an end.

In 1990, Mayfair Games inc. purchased the rights, and the following year published a second edition of the game system called Chill Core Rulebook. Over the next three years, Mayfair published fourteen sourcebooks for the setting and a collection of short stories. Mayfair's game was translated into French by Oriflam in 1994.

In 2012, Mayfair Games sold Chills intellectual property rights to Martin Caron and Renée Dion.

In 2014, Growling Door Games announced they had entered into a licensing agreement with Caron and Dion to publish Chill. The following year, Growling Door Games published the third edition of the game, and released a number of sourcebooks from 2016 until Growling Door ceased operationins in 2019. The third edition and two sourcebooks were translated into French by A.K.A. Games in 2017. The 3rd edition rulebook remains for sale.

In 2019, Salt Circle Games signed an agreement with Caron to release new material for the third edition to be sold via the crowd-sourcing website Patreon. In 2020, Salt Circle Games began closed playtesting of an unannounced fourth edition of Chill and published a supplement for third edition titled Horrors of the Unknown: Volume 1. Salt Circle Games made new third edition character sheets available in 2021. As of 2022, no additional information about a fourth edition or future third edition supplements has been released.

Reception
In the October 1984 edition of Dragon (Issue 90), Jerry Epperson had a few quibbles with various game mechanics. He questioned the economics rules that essentially gave characters access to unlimited amounts of cash. Epperson also wondered why a range stick was included, since there were no regulated combat maneuvering rules that would make use of the stick. And he found the introductory adventure included in the game was overly simplistic: "Terror in Warwick House is much like a guided tour of a national monument. While it portends to be a dangerous place, one gets the feeling that those who fell victim to the sinister occupants before the player characters were called to the scene were either idiots or invalids. The clues required by the characters to dispose of the evil are practically spoon-fed to the players." But Epperson concluded that "these problems are not major flaws in the game’s design; any GM should be able to alter them with little effort. All things considered, the Chill game does just what it sets out to do. It doesn’t stall play with unwieldy rules or sub-systems, and it allows the GM to pace the storyline and preserve the intensity of a situation thanks to the game’s elegant simplicity. As an alternative to dungeon delving, superheroing, or chasing after Cthulhu, the Chill game is something you can really sink your teeth into."

Two reviews of Chill appeared in issues of Space Gamer. In the November–December 1984 edition (Issue No. 71), William Barton admired Chill for being less violent and less weird than other horror roleplaying games, saying, "Chill is a viable alternative in supernatural gaming for those who desire less gunplay than is typical in Stalking or prefer more conventional creatures than the sanity-blasting horrors of CoC." In the July–August 1985 edition (Issue 75), Warren Spector thought that "Though superficially simpler than Call of Cthulhu, the clear leader in the horror field, Chill falls somewhat short of the mark."

In the January 1985 edition of White Dwarf (Issue 61), Angus McLellan gave Chill an average rating of 7 out of 10. McLellan felt the gameplay was fairly slow and lacking in scares; furthermore, Call of Cthulhu had already paved the way for horror-based role-playing games.

Paul Mason reviewed Chill for Imagine magazine, and stated that "if you fancy a game of investigation with gothic horror overtones, and you don't much care for H P Lovecraft's Cthulhu mythos, then Chill would be the game to buy."

In the December 1988 edition of Dragon (Issue 140), Ken Rolston reviewed two supplements published by Pacesetter just before it went out of business, Vampires and Creature Feature. Rolston had a more favourable opinion of Vampires, calling it an "excellent book... The graphic presentation is top-notch." Rolston was particularly enthusiastic about the writing, which he called, "exceptional" and concluded, "I highly recommend this supplement." He was less enthusiastic about Creature Feature, saying, "This supplement lacks the graphic quality or refined presentation of the finer Chill supplements." Rolston thought the concept of allowing players to become monsters and prey on humans did have "an oddly redeeming appeal", but felt that "the replay value [is] negligible." He gave this supplement a thumbs down, saying, "Creature Feature will not be of use to most GMs, but students of the hobby may find it interesting for a brief diversion or as a curiosity."

In Issue 47 of Challenge, Lester W. Smith reviewed the Mayfair edition and noted the abundance of new material. Smith also liked the revamped game mechanics, and concluded, "Problems? None that I've found so far. If you liked the old Chill, I suspect you're going to like the new one even better."

In the October 1992 edition of Dragon (Issue 186), Rick Swan reviewed three supplements that had been published by Mayfair Games: Apparitions Sourcebook, Lycanthropes Sourcebook, and Vampires Sourcebook. Overall, Swan thought the material was not very original: "The designers have hardly let their imaginations run wild; the approach draws primarily from legends and movies, meeting the expectations of conservative horror buffs but rarely exceeding them. Dracula and the Wolfman are welcome; vampiric Martians and lycanthropic cattle need not apply." However, Swan found the books "consistently entertaining and filled with interesting material that is intelligently presented." He concluded, "Players and referees alike should get a kick out these engaging books... I would’ve liked stronger scenarios and a few more adventure hooks, but all in all, the fastidious research, evocative writing, and enthusiasm for the material makes for a winning combination. I’m looking forward to future volumes."

Other reviews and commentary
Different Worlds #37 (Nov./Dec., 1984)
The V.I.P. of Gaming Magazine #4 (July/Aug., 1986)
White Wolf #23 (Oct./Nov., 1990)
 Casus Belli #22 (Oct 1984)
 Casus Belli #23 (Dec 1984)
 Casus Belli #38 (June 1987)
Asimov's Science Fiction v9 n9 (1985 09)
Jeux & Stratégie #46

Pacesetter Ltd (1st edition)

The game components inside the Pacesetter edition are: 
 an 8-page Introductory folio that included four pages of instructions on how to use the action table that governs all activities in the game, and four pages of pregenerated characters; 
 a 64-page Campaign Book; 
 a 32-page Horrors of the Unknown;
 a full-color map of the world; 
 140 double-sided die-cut cardboard counters; 
 a range stick; 
 three 10-sided dice; 
 and a 16-page adventure, "Terror in Warwick House".

Publications
 Chill: Adventures into the Unknown (box set)
 Chill Master's Screen (included Castle Dracula scenario)
 Blood Moon Rising (scenario)
 Creature Feature (sourcebook)
 Death on Tour (scenario)
 Deathwatch on the Bayou (scenario)
 Evenings of Terror with Elvira (book of scenarios hosted by Elvira, Mistress of the Dark)
 Haunter of the Moor (scenario)
 Highland Terror (scenario)
 Isle of the Dead (scenario)
 Things (sourcebook)
 Thutmose's Night (scenario)
 Vampires (sourcebook)
 Vengeance of Dracula (scenario)
 Village of Twilight (scenario)

Board game
 Black Morn Manor, a board game based in the Chill universe, was published by Pacesetter Ltd

Translations

Target Games translated the first edition of Chill and some modules into Swedish and sold them in Sweden between 1985 and 1987, marketed as Chock (Swedish for "shock" and the name of a very popular horror comic book).

Schmidt Spiele translated the first edition of Chill, modules and the board game Black Morn Manor, marketed as Le Manoir des Ténèbres into French.

Mayfair Games (2nd edition)

Publications
 Chill Core Rulebook
 Chill Accessory Pack (included Isle of the Dead scenario)
 Apparitions (sourcebook with scenario) "The Visitation" pg.96
 The Beast Within (standalone RPG compatible with Chill where you play monsters)
 Chill Companion (sourcebook)
 Horrors of North America (sourcebook with scenario) "Once Bitten" pg.81
 Lycanthropes (sourcebook with 2 scenarios) "The Beast of Exmoor" pg.84, "Long Hot Summer" pg.111
 Things (sourcebook) Undead & Buried (scenario)
 Unknown Providence: SAVE in New England (sourcebook with 4 scenarios) "Weekend in New England" pg.30, "Death's Head Revisited" pg.47, "Bitter Remnants" pg.81, "Dark Providence" pg.93
 Vampires (sourcebook with scenario) "Vengeance of Dracula" pg.97
 Veil of Flesh (scenario)
 Voodoo (sourcebook with scenario) "Drums in the Night" pg.93

Fiction
 Chilled to the Bone - anthology of short stories

 Translations 
Oriflam translated the second edition of Chill and some modules into French.

Growling Door Games (3rd edition)
Publications
 Chill 3rd Edition Core Rulebook Chill Master's Screen Chill Tokens Free scenarios A Lamp Gone Dark 
 Big Sky 
 Cold Dark Earth Dead Hearts 
 El Cucuy Came for Carlito 
 High Tide in the Domain of the Mariner 
 Let Sleeping Dogs Lie 
 Manhunt 
 Sunshine in Maine 
 Temple of the Skin Man 
 The Last Stop Boys The Wild Hunt Whispered Confessions 
 Good Fences Make Good Neighbors (free quickstart)
 Monsters (sourcebook)
 SAVE: The Eternal Society (sourcebook with 4 scenarios)
 Undead (sourcebook)

 Translation 
A.K.A. Games translated the third edition of Chill, the Chill Master's Screen, SAVE: The Eternal Society and Monsters into French.

 Salt Circle Games 
Salt Circle Games acquired rights to publish new material for the third edition of Chill and began development of a fourth edition, funding the project through Patreon.
Publications
 Horrors of the Unknown Vol. 1''

References

External links
 Chill official page on Facebook
Salt Circle Games' Chill Patreon
Review in Shadis

 
Horror role-playing games
Mayfair Games games
Pacesetter games
Role-playing games introduced in 1984